Foreign direct investment by Great Britain into Argentina was attempted, initially with little success, from the early years after Argentina's independence in the 1820s. However, it grew to large proportions in the second half of the 19th century and remained so up to the Second World War, in association with greater political stability and favourable policies in Argentina. British ownership of large parts of Argentina's industry and railway system, and British control of the financial capital that backed Argentina's growing prosperity at that time, resulted in a strong relationship between the two countries, which is viewed by some as having contained elements of imperialism. 

Starting with Juan Perón in the 1940s until the 1970s, a series of presidents pursued policies of nationalization and import substitution industrialization, involving domestic ownership of industry and reduced dependence on foreign capital.

Early investment (1820s - 1850s) 
Argentina had a unique relationship with Britain during the period after Argentinian independence all the way up to World War 2. British Investment began in the 1820s, with investments into industries such as mining and agriculture, associated with prospective large-scale immigration from Europe. However, this investment would be worthless by the 1830s and would not prove to be profitable until the 1850s and later.  It was not until the 1860s that investment became continuous enough to have major effects on either the Argentinian or the British economy.  Early investment failed in Argentina because of multiple factors, such as the Cisplatine War against Brazil, bringing a blockade of the Río de la Plata that hampered exports, and an overestimated labour force that did not exist after the revolution. These economic inhibitors were followed by the coming to power of the "cattle baron", Juan Manuel de Rosas, which also deterred foreign investment, and then defaults on loan payments from the time of the revolution.  All of these factors made Argentina appear unstable and therefore diminished foreign investors' willingness to invest in the new state. Therefore, industrialization of Argentina and its vast pampas (plains) would have to wait until the industrializing capital of Great Britain would be imported decades later.

Rivadavia's policies on foreign investment 
Bernardino Rivadavia was the first President of Argentina, from 1826-27.  Rivadavia wanted to open Argentina to liberal policies that he thought would increase wealth and industrialization in Argentina. His policy was to allow free trade and to lower tariffs, replacing them with taxes on the selling and renting of Argentina's plentiful reserves of land. By lowering tariffs Rivadavia intended to make Argentinian products desirable on foreign markets, whilst also selling off Argentinian land to foreign investors who would increase the productivity of the land, as liberal policies at the time claimed to do. Another way Rivadavia tried to secure foreign capital was by encouraging the development of businesses that focused on agriculture and took advantage of immigration.  Rivadavia initiated policies that could have been beneficial to the development of Argentina, but owing to the Cisplatine War the full benefits were never realized.

Later investment (1855 - WW2) 
With the end of Juan Manuel de Rosas' dictatorship in 1852, and followed by liberal government, investment to Argentina was increasing.  A result of this investment was the building of infrastructure to enable international trade. As development of industry grew, and the economy of Argentina strengthened, the quality of life for Argentinians came to be among the highest in the world. Argentinians towards the end of the 19th century were well-fed, well-educated, and industrious compared to most of the world.

British hegemony through investment 
Towards the 1870s, it was clear that the British were extremely influential in the economics of Argentina. This set up a unique power dynamic between the two sovereign states of Great Britain and Argentina. Some scholars have even argued that Argentina was a product of British imperialism. A. G. Hopkins explains that for imperialism to occur, the sovereignty of one state is being diminished by another state with more structural power. Susan Strange, an English political scientist, identified four main forms of structural power in her study States and Markets, one of these is "control over credit", for a developing nation it is clear that a free line of credit is essential to nation-building.  Capital is needed to build industries, and the Argentinians lost their line of credit when they declared independence from Bourbon Spain. Argentina as well as most of Latin America lacked the domestic capital to rebuild after the destruction of infrastructure during the revolutions.  Therefore, the City of London stepped in and funded the capital where Argentina could not.  In return for this foreign capital, the Argentinians were motivated to ensure political stability and keep the interests of the investors in mind.

Investment in the Argentinian railway system 

An essential component of the investment and development of the Argentine economy was the importation of a modern railway system. The British were responsible for the creation of the Argentine railway system.  From 1860 there were 39 kilometers of railways in Argentina; by 1910 there were 23,994 kilometers. At the beginning of the twentieth century the Argentinian railway system was the 10th largest in the world, most of it being a product of English capital financing the new projects.  By 1937 there were around 40,000 kilometers of railways, of which 66% was British owned, a very high proportion of foreign ownership for an independent country at this time.  Since Argentina at this time did not have a well developed steel industry, the Argentinean railway projects needed to be funded by English capital since capital was limited domestically in Argentina. Railway technology also needed to be imported into Argentina from Europe or the USA.

The purpose of the Argentine railway system was not so much to transport people, as to ship out the agrarian products of the pampas.  Since Argentina was developing as an agrarian export economy, railroads were built to connect the rural farmland to the main ports of Argentina, as seen in the map of Argentinian Railways in 1910-1911.  Most of the lines centre on cities such Buenos Aires or Bahia Blanca and branch out to the pampas in order to retrieve goods to bring back and ship out to European markets, mainly the British.  The British would send in industrial goods to make Argentinian agriculture more modern and productive, in exchange for primary products exported to Great Britain.

Modern Investment 
With the 1943 Coup d'Etat in Argentina, and the populist President Juan Perón winning power, investment in Argentina started appearing less profitable. In 1948, Perón nationalized the railway system, which, at the time, was still mainly owned by the British. Many of the military dictators of Latin America in the 20th century were keen to practice Import Substitution Industry, that meant isolating the Latin American economies from the economies of western European and North America.  The method attempted to discourage the buying of finished goods from other countries and instead to produce such goods domestically.  Under the import substitution policy, democratically elected Perón, as well as several dictators, in the latter half of the twentieth century nationalized industries, with the aim of building up the industrial sector without relying on foreign capital. This naturally resulted in decreased foreign investment.

See also
 Economic history of Argentina

References

Further reading
 Cohen, Deborah. "Love and Money in The Informal Empire: The British in Argentina, 1830–1930." Past & Present 245.1 (2019): 79-115.
  Hamshere, Cyril. "The British in Argentina" History Today (July 1971), Vol. 21 Issue 7, pp 510-517, online.
 Rock, David. The British in Argentina: commerce, settlers and power, 1800–2000 (Springer, 2018).

Foreign direct investment
Economic history of Argentina
Outward investment
Argentina–United Kingdom relations